Svayambhuva Manu is the first of the fourteen Manus, the first man of an age in Hindu cosmogony. He is a manasaputra (mind-born son) of Brahma and the husband of Shatarupa, the first woman. He is stated to have divided the Vedas into four sections.

Legend
The creation of Svayambhuva Manu and Shatarupa from the body of Brahma are mentioned in the Puranas:

According to the Bhagavata Purana,

Svayambhuva Manu married Shatarupa. He had two sons named Priyavrata and Uttanapada, and three daughters named Akuti, Devahuti, and Prasuti. Manu married his first daughter Akuti to Rishi Ruci, his middle daughter Devahuti to Prajapati Kardama and his youngest daughter Prasuti to Prajapati Daksha.

Notes

References

Hindu cosmology
Characters in Hindu mythology